This page summarizes projects that propose to bring more than  of new liquid fuel capacity to market with the first production of fuel beginning in 2017.  This is part of the Wikipedia summary of Oil Megaprojects.

Quick links to other years

Detailed list of projects for 2017

References 

2017
Oil fields
Proposed energy projects
Projects established in 2017
2017 in the environment
2017 in technology